Wang Dan (born February 26, 1969) is a leader of the Chinese democracy movement and was one of the most visible student leaders in the Tiananmen Square protests of 1989. He holds a Ph.D. in history from Harvard University, and from August 2009 to February 2010, Wang taught cross-strait history at Taiwan's National Chengchi University, as a visiting scholar. He then taught at National Tsing Hua University until 2015.

Besides conducting research on related topics, Wang is active in promoting freedom and democracy in China. Based in the United States, he travels the world to garner support from Overseas Chinese communities as well as from the public at large. He is a friend of fellow activists Wang Juntao and Liu Gang.

Biography
Wang Dan was born in 1969. He was a politically active student at the Peking University department of history, organizing "Democracy Salons" at his school. When he participated in the student movement that led to the 1989 peaceful protest, he joined the movement's organizing body as the representative from Peking University. As a result, after the Tiananmen Square protests, he immediately became the "most wanted" on the list of 21 fugitives issued. Wang went into hiding but was arrested on July 2 the same year, and sentenced to four years imprisonment in 1991. After being released on parole in 1993, he continued to write publicly (to publications outside of mainland China) and was re-arrested in 1995 for conspiring to overthrow the Chinese Communist Party and was sentenced in 1996 to 11 years. However he was released early and exiled to the United States of America (see below).

Wang resumed his university studies, starting school at Harvard University in 1998 and completing his master's in East Asian history in 2001 and a Ph.D. in 2008. He also performed research on the development of democracy in Taiwan at Oxford University in 2009. He is currently the chairman of the Chinese Constitutional Reform Association.

Wang was interviewed and appeared in the documentary The Beijing Crackdown and the movie Moving the Mountain, about the Tiananmen Square protests. He also featured prominently in Shen Tong's book Almost a Revolution.

He was banned from setting foot on mainland China with his passport expiring in 2003. He attempted to visit Hong Kong in 2004, but was rejected. At that time, he was invited by the Hong Kong Alliance in Support of Patriotic Democratic Movements of China to talk about politics ahead of the 15th anniversary of the June 4 crackdown. Due to a typhoon, Wang finally landed in Hong Kong for the first time, though he was confined to the airport's restricted zone as he had no Hong Kong visa.

Arrest and incarceration
Following the People's Liberation Army's crackdown on the protests, Wang Dan was placed on a list of the 21 most wanted student leaders of the protests. Imprisoned on July 2, 1989, Wang spent nearly two years in custody before his trial in 1991. Wang was charged with spreading counterrevolutionary propaganda and incitement. He was sentenced to 4 years in prison; a relatively mild sentence compared to other political prisoners in China at this time. This short sentence was thought to be caused by two things: the government was unsure of what to do with so many students, and felt pressure due to their high-profile nature. While incarcerated, Wang spent two years at Qincheng Prison, known for its high number of political prisoners. Despite the usual cramped conditions, because of his high-profile case, Wang was given his own cell.

Wang was released in 1993, just months before the end of his sentence. Wang Dan himself has noted this was most likely related to China’s first bid for the Olympic Games since he and 19 other political prisoners were released only a month before the International Olympic Committee was to visit. Almost immediately after his release in 1993 Wang began to promote democracy in China and contacted exiled political activists in the United States. He was arrested for a second time in May 1995, two months after an interview with the US based anti-communist periodical Beijing Spring. In this interview he states: "We should clear a new path and devote ourselves to building a civil society by focusing our efforts on social movements, not political movements, self-consciously maintaining a distance from political power and political organs." (document 3) Wang was held in custody for 17 months before receiving the charge of "plotting to overthrow the government", and was sentenced to 11 years in prison.

Instead of serving his entire sentence, he was released in 1998, ostensibly for "medical reasons" and was sent immediately to the US where he was examined in hospital, and quickly released to live in the United States as an exiled political activist. His release and move to the United States followed an agreement between the United States and China whereby the United States removed its support for a resolution criticizing China at the United Nations Commission on Human Rights, and in return China released political prisoners such as Wang.

Exile in the United States
Not long after Wang arrived in the United States, he began to criticize the Chinese government once again. Wang believes the CCP must change its ways, and in an interview with the US newspaper The Weekly Standard he states: "The key to democracy in China is independence. My country needs independent intellectuals, independent economic actors, independent spirits." Wang received his PhD from Harvard University in 2008, and continues to be actively involved in fighting for change in China. Two of his works include: "20 years after Tiananmen" which takes a look at how economic change has affected the Chinese people, and contains suggestions for social and human rights changes. Wang also wrote "Rebuild China with an Olympic Amnesty" after his arrival in the United States; the document has a more positive outlook, as he felt international events such as the Olympic Games could shed light on human rights issues in China. In 2007 Wang's second sentence expired and he was officially "released" and the certificate was issued to his parents on Oct 2, 2007.

Activism and education work
Wang has been productive in the years after his release from China. Wang has been able to publish articles such as "Rebuild China with an Olympic Amnesty" and "20 years after Tiananmen" as well as give public interviews. His exile in the United States allowed him to attend Harvard University to finish his education, obtaining a history degree. He also became chairman of the Chinese Constitutional Reform Association.

Wang taught PRC history at National Tsing Hua University in Hsinchu, Taiwan from 2010 to 2015. While he was teaching a class in November 2010, a woman carrying a knife entered the room, intending to stab Wang. He was able to remove the knife from the woman before she was able to stab him. He believes that "this was the first time he faced what looked like an attempt on his life". The woman had allegedly been stalking Wang for three years.

According to a Chinese language article from Radio Free Asia, as of July 2009, Wang has a Facebook page that he hopes to use to communicate with people in mainland China.

Wang is a member of the WikiLeaks advisory board.

Wang sits on the Board of Advisors for the Committee for Freedom in Hong Kong (CFHK).

Zoom blocking
An event hosted by Wang on Zoom in the United States was interrupted on June 3, 2020, with his Zoom account being blocked. This led to US lawmakers asking Zoom Video Communications to clarify their relationship with China regarding freedom of speech. Zoom apologized, explaining that company was puzzled with requests from China regarding blocking, but they would not repeat the practice of blocking outside of China.

Political positions

Looking back at Tiananmen
Wang Dan felt there were many things that could have been changed about the movement, and he has raised these issues, both during and after the movement. In an interview with The New York Times published 2 June 1989, Wang states, "I think that the student movements in the future should be firmly based on something solid, such as the democratization of campus life or the realization of civil rights according to the Constitution,… Otherwise, the result is chaos." Another issue Wang raises is the involvement of intellectuals in the movement, expressed in the Times interview as well as a 2008 interview titled "Tiananmen Remembered". In this source he believes that intellectuals were not used early enough in the movement, and their involvement may have changed the course of events. Despite pointing out failures, Wang feels the protests affected the mentality of many Chinese people, arguing the hunger strike was necessary as it allowed greater attention on the movement. In addition to this, Wang feels that the crackdown, and the promotion of democracy garnered the attention of the entire nation and educated people on democracy, which was a new idea for many Chinese people.

On China's economic development
Wang commented at a May 31, 2009, press conference in Toronto on the so-called "Beijing Doctrine": "For the sake of economic improvement, everything can be done, even killing people ... [such a doctrine shows that] the Tiananmen Massacre is still going on, only in different ways: it was the students' lives being taken physically in 1989, but it is the mind of the world being poisoned spiritually today."

See also
List of Chinese dissidents

References

External links

 Wang Dan's Facebook page
 Wang Dan's Twitter account
 Wang Dan's personal website (archived version from 2008)
 
 TIMEasia: The Exile and the Entrepreneur

1969 births
Living people
Chinese democracy activists
Chinese dissidents
Chinese human rights activists
Harvard Graduate School of Arts and Sciences alumni
Peking University alumni
Prisoners and detainees of the People's Republic of China
1989 Tiananmen Square protesters
Academic staff of the National Chengchi University
Academic staff of the National Tsing Hua University